Hendrik Johannes Bekker  (born 12 September 1952 in Nuwerus, Western Cape, South Africa is a former South African rugby union player.

Early life and career 
Bekker was born in the small town of Nuwerus in the North-western region of the Western Cape, but spent most of his school years in Goodwood, Cape Town where he attended JG Meiring High School and represented the school's first team for three years. In 1970 he was selected to represent the Western Province schools team at the annual Craven Week tournament held in Salisbury, Rhodesia (now Harare, Zimbabwe).

Playing career

Provincial career
After school, Bekker enrolled at Paarl Teachers Training College and made his provincial debut for Boland on 24 May 1973 against a touring London Counties team. In 1974 Bekker moved to Stellenbosch University to further his studies and joined the University's rugby club, Maties. He made his debut for Western Province on 10 August 1974 against Transvaal and scored his first try for Western Province.

Two years later, in 1977 Bekker received his call up for military service and he had to join the Defence Force in Bloemfontein. During his time in Bloemfontein he played 27 matches for the Free State. Bekker returned to Stellenbosch in 1979 and again joined the Maties. He also returned to the Western Province team and represented the province until his retirement from playing at the end of 1985. During the 1980s Bekker was part of the Western Province team that won the Currie Cup in 1982, 1983, 1984 and 1985. At the time of his retirement, Bekker scored 44 tries for Western Province, which was the Western Province try scoring record.

International career
Bekker made his test debut for the Springboks during the 1981 tour of New Zealand in the first test on 15 August 1981 at Lancaster Park, Christchurch, New Zealand.  He was not selected for the second test but returned to the side for the third test match against New Zealand at Eden Park, Auckland. Bekker played a further 8 matches on tour for the Springboks, scoring three tries.

Test history

Accolades
Bekker was named the SA Rugby player of the Year for 1983. The other nominees for the award in 1983 were Divan Serfontein, Carel du Plessis, Liaan Kirkham and Ray Mordt.

Coaching
On 1 October 1985, Bekker was appointed assistant–organiser for coaching at the South African Rugby Board. From 1986 to 1989 he acted as forward–coach for Western Province and in 1990 he replaced Dawie Snyman as head coach of Western Province.

Personal
Bekker is the father of Andries Bekker, a former Western Province, Stormers and Springbok Rugby player. Andries is currently playing for Kobelco Steelers in the Japanese Top League.

See also
List of South Africa national rugby union players – Springbok no. 527

References

1952 births
Living people
South African rugby union players
South Africa international rugby union players
Western Province (rugby union) players
People from Matzikama Local Municipality
Rugby union locks
Rugby union players from the Western Cape